Anthony Lindsay Nind,  was an Anglican priest in the 20th century.

He was born in 1926, educated at Balliol and Cuddesdon and ordained in 1953.  He held curacies in Devizes, Wareham and then Hong Kong until 1961. He was the incumbent at Langton Matravers from then until 1968 when he moved to serve the Anglican Episcopal Church of Brazil. Later he was Chaplain of Christ Church Vienna, Archdeacon of Switzerland  and finally Dean of Gibraltar, a post held until 1988.

Notes

1930 births
Alumni of Balliol College, Oxford
Alumni of Ripon College Cuddesdon
Deans of Gibraltar
Members of the Order of the British Empire
Living people
Archdeacons of Switzerland